The following lists events during 1952 in British Hong Kong.

Incumbents
 Monarch of the United Kingdom - George VI (until 6 February), Elizabeth II (from 6 February)
 Governor - Sir Alexander Grantham

Events

January

February

March

April

May

June

July

August

September

October

November

December

Births
January 2 – Ng Man-tat, actor (died 2021)
February 7 – Tony Liu, actor

References

 
Years of the 20th century in Hong Kong
Hong Kong
Hong Kong
1950s in Hong Kong
1952 in the British Empire